Heckmondwike Grammar School (HGS) is an 11–18 mixed, grammar school and sixth form with academy status in Heckmondwike, West Yorkshire, England.

History 
The school was built by the Heckmondwike School Board after it was compelled by the Board of Education to replace various schools across Heckmondwike. The Board began the process in January 1894, and despite much controversy, the building of the school had finished by late 1897. Arthur Alfred Stott of Mirfield was the architect. The school opened on 17 January 1898, with an attendance of 907, with around 150-160 attending the School of Science. The School's Main Hall, now known as the Swann Hall, was named by the School Board after William Edward Forster. 

Following the Education Act 1902 and the wider development of Secondary Education across the country, the Higher Grade School became the Secondary School, as the infant's section was moved into another building. It would be renamed Heckmondwike Grammar School in late 1929. 

Further north in Cleckheaton was Whitcliffe Mount Grammar School, now Whitcliffe Mount School. The existence of Secondary Education across the Spen Valley was decisive as both Heckmondwike and Cleckheaton desired to have the major secondary school in their respective locality. Eventually, Whitcliffe Mount was created after the failure of the West Riding County Council to solve the Spen Valley Question.  

HGS was a foundation school, but became an academy in September 2010.

On 18 January 2011, the Crellin Building was officially opened by Prince Edward, with Ingrid Roscoe and the mayor of Kirklees.

In December 2018, the headteacher at the time, Nathan Bulley, quit following allegations of mismanagement.

Admissions 
HGS is a Technology College. The school has approximately 1,500 pupils aged between 11 and 18 and includes a sixth form.

Prospective pupils pass examinations in verbal reasoning, non-verbal reasoning, English, comprehension and mathematics before entry to the school. After testing, 180–210 pupils are accepted.

The HGS Annexe, which was formerly a church hall, which was previously used for physical education and social sciences was reopened in 2019 as the Jo Cox Sixth Form Centre, in memory of the late MP and former head girl of the School.

Curriculum and performance
Heckmondwike Grammar School follows the England, Wales and Northern Ireland National Curriculum.

In 2010 and 2013/2014 the school was ranked the 5th best-performing school in England for GCSE results. and is regularly among the top 100 state schools in the country.

In December of 2022, Heckmondwike Grammar School was ranked the 2nd best school in the North of England, based on GCSE results.

Headmasters 
 1897–1924 — R S Cahill
 1924–1948 — Harold Edwards
 1948–1952 — E G Bennett
 1952–1956 — E J S Kyte
 1956–1970 — Kenneth Ford, Quaker and Second World War conscientious objector who joined the Friends' Ambulance Unit 
 1970–1989 — T C Riddles
 1989–1990 — J K Wilson (acting head)
 1990–2010 — Mark Crellin Tweedle
 2010–2016 — Mike Cook
 2016–2018 — Nathan Bulley
 2019–present — Peter Roberts

Notable alumni

 John Bentley – retired English rugby union and rugby league footballer
 Tracy Brabin – actress, television writer, Labour Party MP for Batley and Spen 2016–2021, West Yorkshire mayor (2021–present) 
 Luke Burgess – former professional rugby league footballer; older brother of Sam
 Sam Burgess – South Sydney Rabbitohs coach and former rugby league player
 Roger Burnley (born 1966) – businessman, former CEO of Asda 
 Jo Cox, late Labour MP for Batley and Spen 2015–2016 
 John Fozard – late engineer, chief designer of the Hawker Siddeley Harrier from 1965 to 1978 
 Emily Freeman – retired runner, 2008 Olympic relay team member, 2009 European Team Championships team member
 Andrew Gale – professional cricketer, former Yorkshire County Cricket Club captain (2016–2021)
 Sir Basil Houldsworth, 2nd Baronet – late Liberal politician and anaesthetist
 Sir Hubert Houldsworth, 1st Baronet – late barrister, National Coal Board chairman, and Liberal politician
 Kim Leadbeater – Labour politician and Batley and Spen MP (2021–present); younger sister of Jo Cox
 Michael McGowan – journalist, former Labour MEP for Leeds
 Frederick Campion Steward – late botanist and Cornell University professor
 Joe Seddon – entrepreneur, founder of Zero Gravity

References 

Grammar schools in Kirklees
Academies in Kirklees
Training schools in England
Educational institutions established in 1898
1898 establishments in England
Heckmondwike